This is a list of properties and districts in Schley County, Georgia that are listed on the National Register of Historic Places (NRHP).

Current listings

|}

References

Schley
Buildings and structures in Schley County, Georgia